Spherical Worlds is a shoot 'em up video game developed by 4-Matted and published by Neo Software, released for Amiga platforms in 1996. The game plays from a top-down perspective, from which the player controls a spherical battle droid, shooting their way through an enemy battleship. The player can equip the droid with weapon and tool enhancements, such as additional weapons, power-ups, extra lives, and guided missiles, through a special weapon shop shown between game levels.

References 

1996 video games
Amiga games
Amiga-only games
Multidirectional shooters
Video games developed in Croatia
Rockstar Vienna games
Single-player video games